John Evans is an American film director and screenwriter and documentary filmmaker known for such films as The Black Godfather, Blackjack and Speeding Up Time.

References

External links

American documentary film directors
American screenwriters
African-American screenwriters
African-American film directors
Living people
Year of birth missing (living people)
21st-century African-American people